Hans Paul Oster (9 August 1887 – 9 April 1945) was a general in the Wehrmacht and a leading figure of the anti-Nazi German resistance from 1938 to 1943. As deputy head of the counter-espionage bureau in the Abwehr (German military intelligence), Oster was in a good position to conduct resistance operations under the guise of intelligence work.

He was involved in the Oster Conspiracy of September 1938 and was arrested in 1943 on suspicion of helping Abwehr officers caught helping Jews to escape Germany. After the failed 1944 July Plot on Hitler's life, during interrogation, he named Admiral Wilhelm Canaris, the head of Abwehr, as the "spiritual founder of the Resistance Movement".  The Gestapo arrested Canaris and eventually found his diaries, in which Oster's anti-Nazi activities were revealed. In April 1945, he was hanged with Canaris and Dietrich Bonhoeffer at Flossenbürg concentration camp.

Early career
Oster was born in Dresden, Saxony in 1887, the son of an Alsatian pastor of the French Protestant Church. He entered the artillery in 1907 and in World War I, he served on the Western Front until 1916, when he was appointed as captain to the German General Staff. After the war, he was thought of well enough to be kept in the reduced Reichswehr, whose officer corps was limited to 4,000 by the Treaty of Versailles. He had to resign from the army in 1932, when he got into trouble over an indiscretion during the carnival in the demilitarised zone of the Rhineland, where Reichswehr officers were prohibited.

He soon found a job in a new organisation which Hermann Göring set up under the Prussian police. He transferred to the Abwehr in October 1933. It was in this connection that he met Hans Bernd Gisevius and Arthur Nebe, who were working in the Gestapo and became conspirators. Oster also became a confidant of Admiral Canaris.

Opposition to Hitler
Like many other army officers, Oster welcomed the Nazi regime. However, his opinion changed after the 1934 Night of the Long Knives in which the Schutzstaffel (SS) murdered many of the leaders of the rival Sturmabteilung (SA) and their political opponents, including General Kurt von Schleicher, the second-to-last Chancellor of the Weimar Republic and Generalmajor (Major General) Ferdinand von Bredow, former head of the Abwehr. In 1935, Oster was allowed to re-join the army but never on the General Staff. By 1938, the Blomberg–Fritsch Affair and Kristallnacht (the Nazi-led pogrom against Jews in Germany), turned his antipathy into a hatred of Nazism and a willingness to help save Jews. During the Fritsch crisis, Oster met Generaloberst (Colonel General) Ludwig Beck, Chief of the General Staff, for the first time, making the connections for the Oster Conspiracy of September 1938.

Oster's position in the Abwehr was invaluable to the conspirators; Abwehr could provide false papers and restricted materials, disguise conspiratorial activities as intelligence work, link disparate resistance cells, and supply intelligence to the conspirators. He also played a central role in the first military conspiracy to overthrow Hitler, which was rooted in Hitler's intention to invade Czechoslovakia. In August 1938, Beck spoke openly at a meeting of army generals in Berlin about his opposition to a war with the Western powers over Czechoslovakia. When Hitler was informed of that, he demanded and received Beck's resignation. Beck was highly respected in the army and his removal shocked the officer corps. His successor as Chief of Staff, Franz Halder, remained in touch with him and also with Oster. Privately, he said that he considered Hitler "the incarnation of evil".

Oster, Gisevius and Hjalmar Schacht urged Halder and Beck to stage a coup against Hitler. However, the army generals argued that they could mobilise support among the officer corps only if Hitler made overt moves towards war. Halder asked Oster to draw up plans for a coup, and it was eventually agreed that Halder would instigate the coup when Hitler committed an overt step towards war. Emissaries of the conspirators travelled to Britain, with the assistance of Oster and the Abwehr, to urge the British to stand firm against Hitler over the Sudeten crisis. On 28 September, the British Prime Minister Neville Chamberlain agreed to a meeting in Munich, where he accepted the dismemberment of Czechoslovakia. Hitler's diplomatic triumph undermined and demoralised the conspirators. Halder would no longer support a coup. That was the nearest approach to a successful conspiracy against Hitler before the 20 July plot of 1944.

As war again grew more likely in mid-1939, the efforts for a coup were revived. Oster was still in contact with Halder and Witzleben. However, many officers, particularly those from the Prussian Junker background, were strongly anti-Polish and saw a war to regain Danzig and other lost eastern territories as justified. After the outbreak of World War II, resistance in the army became harder to contemplate since it could lead to the defeat of Germany. When Hitler decided to attack France soon after the Polish campaign in 1939, Halder along with other senior generals, thought it to be hopelessly unrealistic and again entertained the idea of a coup, urged by Oster and Canaris. When Hitler vowed to destroy the spirit of Zossen (the headquarters of the Army High Command), meaning defeatism, Halder feared that the conspiracy was about to be discovered and destroyed all incriminating documents.

Oster informed his friend Bert Sas, the Netherlands' military attaché in Berlin, more than twenty times the date of the postponed invasion of the Netherlands. Sas passed the information to his government but was not believed. Oster calculated that his treason could cost the lives of 40,000 German soldiers and wrestled with his decision. However, he then concluded that it was necessary to prevent millions of deaths that would occur in the protracted war after Germany was denied an early victory.

The period between 1940 and 1942 was the nadir of German resistance. Some officers were pleased to be wrong to have feared military disaster. Others still opposed Hitler and the Nazi regime but felt that his enormous popularity with the people made any action impossible. Tireless, Oster rebuilt a resistance network. In 1941, when the systematic extermination of European Jews began after the invasion of the Soviet Union, his Abwehr group established contact with the resistance group of Henning von Tresckow in Army Group Centre. In 1942, his most important recruit was General Friedrich Olbricht, head of the General Army Office, at the Bendlerblock in central Berlin, who controlled an independent system of communications to reserve units all over Germany. The Oster group supplied British-made bombs to Tresckow's group for their attempts to assassinate Hitler in 1943.

In 1943, the Abwehr group's rescue efforts for Jews were exposed by the Gestapo and Oster was dismissed from his post. Hans von Dohnanyi, who joined the Abwehr shortly before the war and Dietrich Bonhoeffer, the Lutheran theologian and Dohnanyi's brother-in-law, helped 14 Jews to flee to Switzerland disguised as Abwehr agents in Operation (Unternehmen) U-7. Dohnanyi and Bonhoeffer were arrested on charges of alleged breach of monetary exchange laws, amongst others, with the leading German insurance brokers Jauch & Hübener, Captain Walter Jauch of the Jauch family, a first cousin-in-law of Oster, and Otto Hübener later being hanged. Oster was placed under house arrest; their involvement in the German resistance was discovered after the failure of the 20 July plot.

Death
Oster was arrested the day after the failed 20 July plot to assassinate Hitler. On 4 April 1945, the diaries of Admiral Canaris were discovered and in a rage upon reading them, Hitler ordered that all current and past conspirators—Oster among them—be executed.

On 8 April 1945, Oster, Dietrich Bonhoeffer, Wilhelm Canaris, and other anti-Nazis were convicted and sentenced to death by an SS drumhead court-martial presided over by Otto Thorbeck. At dawn the next day, Oster, Bonhoeffer and Canaris were hanged in the Flossenbürg concentration camp. They were forced to strip naked before being taken to the gallows. The camp was liberated two weeks later by American forces.

Fabian von Schlabrendorff, one of the few senior anti-Nazis to survive the war, described Oster as "a man such as God meant men to be, lucid and serene in mind, imperturbable in danger".

See also
 List of members of the 20 July plot
 Oster Conspiracy

Footnotes

Further reading

 Joachim Fest. Plotting Hitler's Death: The German Resistance to Hitler, 1933–1945 (London, Weidenfeld & Nicolson, 1996)
 Peter Hoffmann. The History of the German Resistance, 1933–1945 (Montreal, McGill-Queen's University Press, 1996)
 Roger Moorhouse. Killing Hitler (London, Jonathan Cape, 2006)
 Romedio Galeazzo Graf von Thun-Hohenstein Der Verschwörer, General Oster und die Militäropposition (Berlin, Severin und Siedler 1982)

External link

1887 births
1945 deaths
Military personnel from Dresden
Abwehr personnel of World War II
German Army personnel of World War I
German Lutherans
People executed by Nazi Germany by hanging
People from the Kingdom of Saxony
Extrajudicial killings in World War II
Executed members of the 20 July plot
People who died in Flossenbürg concentration camp
Military personnel who died in Nazi concentration camps
Resistance members who died in Nazi concentration camps
Executed military leaders
People educated at the Kreuzschule
People from Saxony executed in Nazi concentration camps
People who were court-martialed
Nazi-era German officials who resisted the Holocaust